Bålsta is a locality and the seat of Håbo Municipality, Uppsala County, Sweden with 13 138 inhabitants in 2015.

Although not in Stockholm County, it has Bålsta Station, the north-western terminus of the Stockholm suburban rail system. Many inhabitants commute to Stockholm. The travel time is 40 minutes by suburban train, and less than 30 minutes by commuter-or intercity rail. Lasse Åberg, a famous Swedish actor, musician and artist, lives in Bålsta and has opened a museum there.

Even though Bålsta's relatively small size, there are many organizations and activity-centers in the town, such as a hockey-arena hosting the team Bålsta HC. It also has a mall with several stores.

Famous people from Bålsta
 Martin Björk, Swedish television presenter
 Daniel Jarl, Swedish football player
 Marcus Nilson, Swedish professional ice hockey player
 Kim Amb, Swedish professional javelin thrower
 Filip Windlert, Swedish professional Ice hockey player for AIK in HockeyAllsvenskan

See also
Bålstaåsen

References 

Populated lakeshore places in Sweden
Municipal seats of Uppsala County
Swedish municipal seats
Populated places in Uppsala County
Populated places in Håbo Municipality